James Richard "Richie" Blackmore (born 2 July 1969) is a rugby league coach, and former professional footballer who represented New Zealand.

Early years
An Otahuhu junior, Blackmore also played rugby union until he was 21. He was regarded as a promising loose forward.

Castleford
Blackmore joined Castleford at the start of the 1991-92 season and quickly established himself in the team. He played 111 senior games for the club, leaving at the end of the 19941995 season. It was in Castleford that Blackmore had an off field incident with Tawera Nikau that resulted in Nikau refusing to play for the New Zealand national rugby league team if Blackmore was in the same team.

Richie Blackmore played left- and scored a try in Castleford's 1228 defeat by Wigan in the 1992 Challenge Cup Final during the 1991–92 season at Wembley Stadium, London on Saturday 2 May 1992, in front of a crowd of 77,386.

Richie Blackmore played right- in Castleford Tigers' 332 victory over Wigan in the 1993–94 Regal Trophy Final during the 1993–94 season at Headingley, Leeds on Saturday 22 January 1994.

Auckland Warriors
Blackmore joined the new Auckland Warriors side in 1995, however he missed the opening rounds due to the overlap with the British season. As a result, he found it hard to secure a place in the starting line up and played only ten first grade games in 1995.

Blackmore played another seventeen games for the Auckland Warriors in 1996 before deciding to return to England.

Leeds Rhinos
Blackmore joined the Leeds Rhinos in 1997, joining the Super League competition. He went on to play 45 first grade games for the club.

In mid-1999 Blackmore suffered a serious leg injury that kept him out for most of the season.

In 2000, while recovering from injury, Blackmore played rugby union for the Leeds Tykes against Sale in Round Four of the Tetley's Bitter Cup.

Return & Retirement
At the end of the 2000 season Blackmore signed a one-year deal with the renamed New Zealand Warriors who were looking for an experience back to help shape their youthful squad. Blackmore played eight first grade games for the club, before retiring at the end of the season.

He continued to play in the Auckland Rugby League competition, moving into the second row. In 2005 he was the player-coach of the Manurewa Marlins when they won the Fox Memorial. He retired properly at the end of that season, taking up the head coach position at Otahuhu in 2006.

International career
Richie Blackmore was a New Zealand international, making his début for the Kiwis in 1991. Blackmore represented the Kiwis in both the 1995 and 2000 Rugby League World Cups.

Coaching
After retiring from playing Blackmore remained involved with the Warriors, and was often seen running out water to the team during matches.

In 2006 Blackmore accepted a role as head coach of the Otahuhu Leopards in the Auckland Rugby League competition. He held this position until the end of 2010, leading the team to a Fox Memorial grand final victory over the Mt Albert Lions.

In 2008 Blackmore joined the New Zealand Māori team as assistant coach. He was co-coach in 2010 along with Mark Horo.

In 2011 Blackmore was appointed as head coach of the Auckland Vulcans in the NSW Cup, and coached the team to the Grand Final.

In 2012 he was to be appointed coach of the Leigh Centurions, however visa concerns meant he was instead appointed as the club's Business Development Manager, starting his position in April 2012.

In 2014 he coached the Papakura Sea Eagles in the Auckland Rugby League competition. He coached Auckland in 2015.

References

External links
The Teams: New Zealand 
(archived by web.archive.org) Castleford RLFC A to Z Player List (All Time)
(archived by web.archive.org) Statistics at thecastlefordtigers.co.uk ℅ web.archive.org

1969 births
Living people
Auckland rugby league team coaches
Auckland rugby league team players
Castleford Tigers players
Leeds Rhinos players
Leeds Tykes players
Leigh Leopards coaches
Manurewa Marlins coaches
Manurewa Marlins players
New Zealand Māori rugby league players
New Zealand Māori rugby league team coaches
New Zealand national rugby league team players
New Zealand expatriate sportspeople in England
New Zealand rugby league coaches
New Zealand rugby league players
New Zealand rugby union players
New Zealand Warriors players
Otahuhu Leopards coaches
Otahuhu Leopards players
Papakura Sea Eagles coaches
Rugby league centres